

Denmark
Danish Gold Coast – Christian Schiønning, Governor of the Danish Gold Coast (1807–1817)
Danish West Indies –
Peter Lotharius von Oxholm, Governor-General of the Danish West Indies (1815–1816)
Johan Henrik von Stabel, Governor-General of the Danish West Indies (1816)
Adrian Benjamin Bentzon, Governor-General of the Danish West Indies (1816–1820)
Iceland – Johan Carl Thuerecht Castenschiold, Governor of Iceland (1813–1819)
North Greenland – Peter Hanning Motzfeldt, Inspector of North Greenland (1803–1817)
South Greenland – Marcus Nissen Myhlenphort, Inspector of South Greenland (1802–1821)

France
French Guiana – under Portuguese rule (1809–1817)
Guadeloupe –
Occupied by British 10 August 1815 – 25 July 1816
Antoine Philippe de Lardenoy, Governor of Guadeloupe (1816–1823)
Martinique – Pierre-René-Marie, comte de Vaugiraud, Governor of Martinique (1814–1818)
Réunion – Athanase Hyacinthe Bouvet de Lozier, Governor of Réunion (1815–1817)

Netherlands
Aruba –
Occupied by British (1805–1816)
Lodewijk Christoph Boyé, Commander of Aruba (1816–1819)
Dutch Gold Coast – Abraham de Veer, Commandant-General of the Dutch Gold Coast (1810–March 1, 1816); Herman Willem Daenels, Governor-General of the Dutch Gold Coast (to 1818)
Surinam –
 Occupied by British (1804–1816)
Willem Benjamin van Panhuys, Governor-General of Dutch Guiana (1816)
Cornelis Reinhard Vaillant, Acting Governor-General of Dutch Guiana, (1816–1822)

Portugal
Angola –
 José de Oliveira Barbosa, Governor of Angola (1810–1816)
 Luís da Mota Fêo e Torres, Governor of Angola (1816–1819)
Cape Verde – António Coutinho de Lencastre, Governor of Cape Verde (1803–1818)
Bissau – António Cardoso Figueiredo, Captain-Major of Bissau
Cacheu – Unknown
Portuguese Timor – José Pinto Alcoforado de Azevedo e Sousa, Governor of East Timor (1815–1819)
French Guiana – João Severiano Maciel da Costa, Governor of French Guiana (1809–1817); also technically owned by Spain
Macau – Lucas José de Alvarenga, Governor of Macau (1814–1817)
Mozambique – Marcos Caetano de Abreu e Meneses, Captain-General of Mozambique (1812–1817)

Spanish Empire
Viceroyalty of New Granada – Francisco Montalvo y Ambulodi Arriola y Casabant Valdespino, Viceroy of New Granada (1816–1818)
Viceroyalty of New Spain –
 Félix María Calleja del Rey, conde de Calderón, Viceroy of New Spain (1813–1816)
 Juan Ruíz de Apodaca, conde de Venadito, Viceroy of New Spain (1816–1821)
Captaincy General of Cuba –
Juan Ruíz de Apodaca, Governor of Cuba (1812–1816)
José Cienfuegos, Governor of Cuba (1816–1819)
Spanish East Indies –
 José de Gardoqui Jaraveita, Governor-General of the Philippines (1813–1816)
 Mariano Fernández de Folgueras, Governor-General of the Philippines (1816–1822)
Captaincy General of Santo Domingo – Carlos de Urrutia y Montoya, Governor of Santo Domingo (1813–1819)
Viceroyalty of Peru –
José Fernando Abascal y Sousa, marqués de la Concordia, Viceroy of Peru (1806–1816)
Joaquín de la Pezuela y Sánchez, marqués de Viluma, Viceroy of Peru (1816–1821)
Captaincy General of Chile – Francisco Casimiro Marcó del Ponte Angel-Díaz y Méndez, Governor and Captain-General of Chile (1815–1818)

Sweden
Saint-Barthélemy –
Bernt Robert Gustaf Stackelberg, Governor of Saint-Barthélemy (1812–1816)
Johan Samuel Rosensvärd, Governor of Saint-Barthélemy (1816–1818)

British Empire
Alderney – John Le Mesurier III, Governor of Alderney (1803–1825), Pierre Gauvin, Judge of Alderney (1807–1836)
Sark – Pierre Le Pelley II, Seigneur of Sark (1778–1820)
Antigua-Barbuda-Montserrat –
Part of Leeward Islands
George William Ramsay, Governor of Antigua (1816–1819)
Assiniboia –
 Colin Robertson, Governor of Assiniboia (1815–1816)
 Robert Semple, Governor of Assiniboia (1816)
 Alexander MacDonell, Governor of Assiniboia (1816–1822)
Australia – see New South Wales
The Bahamas – Charles Cameron, Governor of the Bahamas (1804–1820)
Barbados – Sir James Leith, Governor of Barbados (1815–1816)
Berbice – Henry William Bentinck, Lieutenant Governor of Berbice (1814–1820)
British Columbia – John Haldane, Governor of British Columbia (1813–1823)
British North America –
vacant (1815–1816) During the American War of 1812, Lieutenant-General Sir George Prevost had been Captain-General and Governor-in-Chief in and over the Provinces of Upper-Canada, Lower-Canada, Nova-Scotia, and New~Brunswick, and their several Dependencies, Vice-Admiral of the same, Lieutenant-General and Commander of all His Majesty’s Forces in the said Provinces of Lower Canada and Upper-Canada, Nova-Scotia and New-Brunswick, and their several Dependencies, and in the islands of Newfoundland, Prince Edward, Cape Breton and the Bermudas, &c. &c. &c. Beneath Prevost, the staff of the British Army in the Provinces of Nova-Scotia, New-Brunswick, and their Dependencies, including the Islands of Newfoundland, Cape Breton, Prince Edward and Bermuda had been under the command of Lieutenant-General Sir John Coape Sherbrooke.
Sir John Coape Sherbrooke, Governor General of British North America (1816–1818)
Cape Breton Island –
 Hugh Swayne, Lieutenant Governor of Cape Breton Island (1813–1816)
 George Robert Ainslie, Lieutenant Governor of Cape Breton Island (1816–1820)
Lower Canada –
 Sir Gordon Drummond, Acting Lieutenant-Governor of Lower Canada (1815–1816)
 John Wilson, Acting Governor of Lower Canada (1816)
 Sir John Coape Sherbrooke, Governor of Lower Canada (1816–1818)
New Brunswick –
 Lieutenant Governor – Thomas Carleton, Lieutenant-Governor of New Brunswick (1786–1817)
 Administrator (acting for Carleton) –
 George Stracey Smyth – Administrator of New Brunswick (1814–1816)
 Harris Hailes – Administrator of New Brunswick (1816–1817, Lieutenant Governor 1817–1823)
Nova Scotia –
 Sir John Coape Sherbrooke, Governor of Nova Scotia (1811–1816)
 George Stracey Smyth, Acting Governor of Nova Scotia (1816)
 George Ramsay, 9th Earl of Dalhousie, Governor of Nova Scotia (1816–1820)
Prince Edward Island – Charles Douglass Smith, Governor of Prince Edward Island (1812–1824)
Bermuda – Major-General George Horsford (Lieutenant-Governor of Bermuda 1812–1816)
Upper Canada – Francis Gore, Lieutenant-Governor of Upper Canada (1815–1817)
 Cayman Islands – William Bodden, Chief Magistrate of the Cayman Islands (1776–1823)
Ceylon – Robert Brownrigg, Governor of Ceylon (1812–1820)
Demerara-Essequibo – John Murray, Lieutenant-Governor of Demerara-Essequibo (1813–1824)
Dominica – Charles William Maxwell, Governor of Dominica (1816–1819)
The Gambia – Alexander Grant, Commandant of The Gambia (1815–1829)
Gibraltar – Sir George Don, Governor of Gibraltar (1814–1821)
Gold Coast – Edward White, Governor of the Committee of Merchants (1807–April 21, 1816); Joseph Dawson (to 1817)
Grenada – George Paterson, Acting Lieutenant Governor of Grenada (1815–1816); Phineas Riall, Lieutenant Governor of Grenada (to 1823), Peter de Havilland, Bailiff of Grenada (1810–1821)
Guadeloupe –
Sir James Leith, Governor of Guadeloupe (1815–1816)
Returned to France
Guernsey – George Pembroke, Earl of Pembroke, Governor of Guernsey (1807–1827)
Heligoland – Charles Hamilton, Lieutenant Governor of Heligoland (1814–1817)
Ionian Islands – Sir Thomas Maitland, Lord High Commissioner of the Ionian Islands (1815–1823); de facto protectorate
India – Francis Rawdon-Hastings, 2nd Earl of Moira, Governor-General of India (1813–1823)
Jamaica – William Montagu, 5th Duke of Manchester, Governor of Jamaica (1813–1821)
Belize – Sir George Arthur, Superintendent of Belize (1814–1822)
Cayman Islands – William Bodden, Chief Magistrate of the Cayman Islands (1776–1823)
Leeward Islands –
Sir James Leith, Governor of the Leeward Islands (1814–1816)
Leeward Islands colony divided in 1816:
Antigua-Barbuda-Montserrat colony
St. Christopher, Nevis, and Anguilla plus British Virgin Islands as a new colony
Malta – Sir Thomas Maitland, Governor of Malta (1813–1824)
Mauritius – Sir Robert Townsend Farquhar, Governor of Mauritius (1810–1823)
New South Wales – Lachlan Macquarie, Governor of New South Wales (1810–1821)
Van Diemen's Land – Thomas Davey, Lieutenant Governor of Van Diemen's Land (1813–1817)
Newfoundland –
Sir Richard Godwin Keats, Commodore-Governor of Newfoundland (1813–1816)
Francis Pickmore, Commodore-Governor of Newfoundland (1816–1818)
Rupert's Land –
 Robert Semple, Governor-in-Chief of Rupert's Land (1815–1816)
 James Curtis Bird, Governor-in-Chief of Rupert's Land (1816–1818)
St. Christopher-Nevis-Anguilla-British Virgin Islands
Part of Leeward Islands
Stedman Rawlins, Governor (1816)
Thomas Probyn, Governor (1816–1821)
St. Lucia –
Edward Stehelin, Governor of St. Lucia (1815–1816)
Robert Douglas, Governor of St. Lucia (1816)
Richard Augustus Seymour, Governor of St. Lucia (1816–1817)
St. Vincent – Charles Brisbane, Governor of St. Vincent (1808–1829)
Tobago –
John Balfour, Acting Governor of Tobago (1815–1816)
Sir Frederick Philipse Robinson, Governor of Tobago (1816–1827)
Trinidad – Sir Ralph James Woodford, Governor of Trinidad (1813–1828)

Colonial governors
Colonial governors
1816